Overheard 3 is a 2014 Hong Kong-Chinese crime-thriller film written and directed by Alan Mak and Felix Chong and starring Sean Lau, Louis Koo, Daniel Wu, Zhou Xun and Michelle Ye. It is a sequel to the 2011 film Overheard 2 in which Lau, Koo and Wu play different roles with a different storyline (abolishing the Small House Policy), but the key elements of the previous two films are kept. The film was released in China on 29 May 2014 and in Hong Kong on 5 June 2014.

Overheard 3 won three awards at the 34th Hong Kong Film Awards including Best Actor for Lau, Best Supporting Actor for Kenneth Tsang and Best Screenplay, while also nominated for eight other awards.

Cast
 Sean Lau as Luk Kam-keung
 Louis Koo as Law Wing-jau
 Daniel Wu as Joe
 Zhou Xun as Moon
 Michelle Ye as Luk Wing-yu
 Alex Fong as Fu
 Kenneth Tsang as Uncle To
 Ng Man-tat as Szeto
 Huang Lei as Wan
 Gordon Lam as Paul
 Dominic Lam as Chuck
 Huang Yi as Fu's wife
 Chin Ka-lok as Yuen
 Wilfred Lau as Dragon boy
 Vincent Kok as Computer expert
 Law Lan as Aunt Gil
 Yeung Ying-wai as Villagers A
 Kwok Fung as Uncle Nine
 Vincent Lo as Sunny
 Ben Yuen as Worker B
 Felix Lok as Mark
 Tony Ho as Head of trucker
 Lung Tin-sang as Hung
 Candy Yuen as a prostitute (uncredited)

Reception
Boon Chan of The Straits Times states "The complicated web of relationships and land dealings plus the high-tech electronic monitoring make Overheard 3 feel overstuffed and underwhelming."

Gabriel Chong of Moviexclusive.com gave the film a 2.5 out of 5 stars, and states "Compared to its predecessors too, the storytelling goes bogged down in way too much exposition particularly in the middle segment."

The film grossed ¥27.7 million (US$4.43 million) on the opening day in China.

Awards and nominations

References

External links
 

2014 crime thriller films
2014 films
2010s Cantonese-language films
Chinese crime thriller films
Films directed by Alan Mak
Films directed by Felix Chong
Hong Kong crime thriller films
Polybona Films films
2010s Mandarin-language films
2010s Hong Kong films